Bartın Naval Base is a submarine base of the Turkish Navy on the southern coast of the Black Sea in Bartın Province north of Turkey. The base is assigned to the Turkish Northern Sea Area Command.

The submarine pen, adjacent to the Port of Bartın, was built between 1960 and 1965 by the Turkish construction company STFA to give underground shelter to the Black Sea submarine flotilla.

References 

Turkish Navy bases
Economy of Bartın
Military in Bartın
Buildings and structures in Bartın Province